Mary P. Edmonds (May 7, 1922 – April 16, 2005) was a biochemist who made key discoveries regarding the processing of messenger RNA (mRNA). She spent most of her career at the University of Pittsburgh.

Education and career 
Edmonds was born May 7, 1922 in Racine, Wisconsin. She received a Bachelor's degree from Milwaukee-Downer College in 1943, a master's degree from Wellesley College in 1945, and a Ph.D. from the University of Pennsylvania in 1951. Following her Ph.D., she was a postdoctoral researcher at University of Illinois (1950-1952) and University of Wisconsin (1952-1955), and then joined Montefiore Hospital in Pittsburg as a research associate from 1955 until 1965. Starting in 1962 she held appointments at the University of Pittsburgh, initially as adjunct and research professor positions, until she joined the faculty in 1971 and was promoted to professor in 1976.

Edmonds took emeritus status in 1992, and died of complications related to a heart attack on April 16, 2005.

Research 
Edmonds was known for her research in mRNA processing, specifically on 3'-end processing and how RNA is spliced. Her research showed that the end of mRNA is a poly-A tail composed of multiple adenosine residues. In her memoirs posted at the National Academy of Sciences, her work discovering the poly-A tails on eukaryotic mRNA and purification of the poly-A polymerase enzyme are described as "landmarks in the field". Edmonds also developed the first method to use the poly-A tail to separate mRNA from other nucleic acids, a protocol which forms the beginning of all modern transcriptomics analysis. In the 1980s, Edmonds showed that poly-A RNA is branched, a stage that arises during processing of hnRNA into mRNA. This research led to the development of antibodies targeting branched RNA.

Selected publications

Awards and accolades 
Edmonds was elected to the National Academy of Sciences in 1991. She was awarded an honorary degree by Lawrence University in 1983, named woman of the year in science by Chatham University in 1986, and received the Chancellor’s Distinguished Research Award Winners from the University of Pittsburg in 1989. After her death, the University of Pittsburg established the Mary P. Edmonds Award given each year to a graduate student in recognition of an "outstanding research paper".

References

External links 

 Marlene Belfort, "Mary P. Edmonds", Biographical Memoirs of the National Academy of Sciences (2014)

1922 births
2005 deaths
People from Racine, Wisconsin
Milwaukee-Downer College alumni
Scientists from Wisconsin
Members of the United States National Academy of Sciences
Wellesley College alumni
University of Pennsylvania alumni
University of Pittsburgh faculty
American biochemists
Women geneticists